In mathematics and string theory, a conifold is a generalization of a manifold. Unlike manifolds, conifolds can contain conical singularities, i.e. points whose neighbourhoods look like cones over a certain base. In physics, in particular in flux compactifications of string theory, the base is usually a five-dimensional real manifold, since the typically considered conifolds are complex 3-dimensional (real 6-dimensional) spaces.

Overview
Conifolds are important objects in string theory: Brian Greene explains the physics of conifolds in Chapter 13 of his book The Elegant Universe—including the fact that the space can tear near the cone, and its topology can change.

A well-known example of a conifold is obtained as a deformation limit of a quintic - i.e. a quintic hypersurface in the projective space . The space  has complex dimension equal to four, and therefore the space defined by the quintic (degree five) equations:

This family of quintic hypersurfaces is the most famous example of Calabi–Yau manifolds. If the complex structure parameter  is chosen to become equal to one, the manifold described above becomes singular since the derivatives of the quintic polynomial in the equation vanish when all coordinates  are equal or their ratios are certain fifth roots of unity. The neighbourhood of this singular point looks like a cone whose base is topologically just.

In the context of string theory, the geometrically singular conifolds can be shown to lead to completely smooth physics of strings.

for the purpose. The two topologically distinct ways of smoothing a conifold are thus shown to involve replacing the singular vertex (node) by either a 3-sphere (by way of deforming the complex structure) or a 2-sphere (by way of a "small resolution"). It is believed that nearly all Calabi–Yau manifolds can be connected via these "critical transitions", resonating with Reid's conjecture.

References

Further reading
 

 
Hübsch, Tristan "Conifolds and 'The (Real Worlds-Wide-)Web'" (2009), " Conifolds and 'The (Real Worlds-Wide-)Web'" (2022)

Algebraic geometry
Generalized manifolds
Singularity theory
String theory